The 1956–57 season was the 49th year of football played by Dundee United, and covers the period from 1 July 1956 to 30 June 1957. United finished in thirteenth place in the Second Division.

Match results
Dundee United played a total of 50 competitive matches during the 1956–57 season.

Legend

All results are written with Dundee United's score first.
Own goals in italics

Second Division

Scottish Cup

League Cup

See also
 1956–57 in Scottish football

References

Dundee United F.C. seasons
Dundee United